Christian Holten Bonke (born 13 August 1973) is a Danish documentary filmmaker and screenwriter. He has directed music videos, commercials and documentary series for television, most recently Uffe’s Alternative. (2 episodes, DR 2015). He was educated at the National Film School of Denmark, graduating in 2005.

His film Ballroom Dancer (2011), won several awards from around the world. The film is a documentary portrait of a retired ballroom dancer, who attempts to return to the world elite; a quest with a high personal cost. The documentaries Bonke chooses to work on usually have a dramatic character. The person portrayed develops and has a mission to accomplish.

This gives Bonke the opportunity to work with a variety of dramatic and visual tricks, perhaps more typical from feature film. We see examples of this in First Love (2007),  and Ejersbo.

In the TV documentary Uffe's Alternative, he follows politician Uffe Elbæk with his camera in the hectic period from the formation of the party The Alternative in November 2013, through to the June 2015 general election. The film joins the documentary style of the observing camera, or direct cinema, often used in political documentaries.

A recurring theme in Bonke’s films, regardless of form, is the fascination with someone who is truly passionate about an idea. His films are very personal portraits, and he always puts the human aspect at the apex.

Filmography

References

External links
http://www.dfi.dk/faktaomfilm/person/en/167852.aspx?id=167852
http://filmcentralen.dk/gymnasiet/undervisning/ejersbo#3601-8834
http://digitalt.tv/uffes-alternativ-paa-dr2/
http://www.dfi.dk/faktaomfilm/film/en/70394.aspx?id=70394

1973 births
Living people
Danish documentary filmmakers
Danish male screenwriters
People from Fredericia
Danish film directors